Have Moicy! is a 1976 album released by Michael Hurley, The Unholy Modal Rounders, and Jeffrey Frederick & the Clamtones.
In 2011 Light In The Attic Records reissued Have Moicy! on vinyl. It is difficult to give credit to which band performs on which song because there are no credits to the individual groups.

Track listing
This collaboration with the Unholy Modal Rounders, Michael Hurley, and Jeffrey Frederick & the Clamtones, was named "the greatest folk album of the rock era" by The Village Voice'''s Robert Christgau.

"Midnight in Paris" – 3:17 (Peter Stampfel aka the Unholy Modal Rounders)
"Robbin' Banks" – 4:00 (Jeffrey Frederick and the Clamtones)
"Slurf Song" – 3:18 (Michael Hurley)
"Jackknife/The Red Newt" – 3:29 (Jeffrey Frederick and the Clamtones)
"Griselda" – 2:22 (Peter Stampfel)
"What Made My Hamburger Disappear" – 3:05 (Jeffrey Frederick and the Clamtones)
"Sweet Lucy" – 4:05 (Michael Hurley)
"Country Bump" – 2:38 (Peter Stampfel)
"Fooey Fooey" – 2:55 (Michael Hurley)
"Jealous Daddy's Death Song" (Karl Davis) – 2:04 (Peter Stampfel)
"Driving Wheel" – 3:45  (Michael Hurley)
"Weep Weep Weep" – 2:13 (Jeffrey Frederick and the Clamtones)
"Hoodoo Bash" – 3:32 (Peter Stampfel)

Covers

"Griselda" was covered by indie rock band Yo La Tengo in their 1990 album Fakebook.

"Sweet Lucy" was covered by indie folk musician Cass McCombs on a 2020 split release with Steve Gunn. Ekoostik Hookah covered "Sweet Lucy" on their 2002 release, Ohio Grown.

References

 External links 
 Robert Christgau review for Details''

Folk albums by American artists
1976 albums
Rounder Records albums